Dominik Daxlberger (born 7 February 1993 in Rosenheim) is a German professional ice hockey player. He currently plays for Düsseldorfer EG in the Deutsche Eishockey Liga (German Ice Hockey League).

References

External links

1993 births
Living people
Düsseldorfer EG players
German ice hockey forwards
People from Rosenheim
Sportspeople from Upper Bavaria